Marilyn Cade (November 24, 1947 – November 3, 2020) was an Internet activist and one of the co-founders of ICANN.

Education 
Cade received an Master of Social Work in Organizational Development from Saint Louis University.

Career 
Cade started her career in the 1970's as a social worker in Missouri, and spent 10 years working in various nonprofit organizations and state governments of the United States positions.

AT&T 
In the 1980's, Cade began working at AT&T, working her way up through a number of management positions with AT&T’s business units in sales, marketing, business operations and strategy. By the early 1990's, Cade became a major fundraiser for Bill Clinton, working her way up to become AT&T's chief lobbyist on technology policy issues as the Director of Internet and E-commerce Advocacy.

Cade was appointed to support AT&T's participation in the International Telecommunication Union Secretary General's High Level Expert Group on Cyber Security in early 2008. 

Cade helped to found and lead numerous industry coalitions and initiatives, ranging from e-commerce, copyright and trademark, cyber crime, child safety online, and internet governance. Her leadership was paramount in the restructuring of the Ad Hoc Copyright Coalition, the Online Privacy Alliance and GetNetWise.

2000s 
After retiring from AT&T, Cade founded a consulting business, mCADE ICT Strategies. She advised organizations such as the World Information Technology and Services Alliance about international internet policy matters.

Activism 
She was also Chief Catalyst at the Internet Governance Forum USA. She helped IGF become a global platform, working to help other countries organize their own national IGF conferences, and worked for the inclusion of communities from developing countries to help them with their own National, Regional and Youth initiatives. Cade emphasized what was called the "multi-stakeholder model" of internet governance, working to maximize inclusive policymaking and taking an active role in mentoring. 

She was a founder of ICANN's Business Constituency trying to help NGOs work alongside businesses to work on Internet infrastructure issues.

Awards 
Cade was posthumously awarded the 2021 ICANN Community Excellence Award, alongside Rafik Dammak.

Personal life 
Cade grew up in the rural town of Ava, Missouri with one sister who passed away in 2016.

References

1947 births
2020 deaths
People from Ava, Missouri
Saint Louis University alumni
Technology evangelists